Edmund Nuttall DD (d. 1616) was a Canon of Windsor from 1602 to 1616.

Career

He was educated at Pembroke College, Oxford, where he graduated with BA in 1585, an MA in 1588, and a DD in 1608.

He was appointed:

 Rector of St Mary Somerset, London, 1596–1616
 Vicar of Ruislip, 1615–1616
 
He was appointed to the eleventh stall in St George's Chapel, Windsor Castle in 1602, and held the canonry until his death in 1616.

Notes 

1616 deaths
Alumni of Pembroke College, Oxford
Canons of Windsor
Year of birth unknown